Vellam is a 1985 Indian Malayalam-language film, directed by Hariharan, starring Prem Nazir and Madhu , supported by K. R. Vijaya and Srividya, with Sathaar, Sukumari, Adoor Bhasi and Balan K. Nair playing other important roles.

The movie had songs composed by G. Devarajan and background score composed by Salil Chowdhury.

Actor Devan is the producer of Vellam. The film delayed for 5 years to be produced, which put the producer Devan in a dire financial strain.

Cast 

Prem Nazir 
Madhu 
K. R. Vijaya
Srividya 
Sathaar
Sukumari
Adoor Bhasi
Menaka
Kottayam Santha 
V. T. Aravindakshamenon
Aranmula Ponnamma
Bahadoor
Balan K. Nair
Bhaskara Kurup
G. K. Pillai
Kunjandi
Oduvil Unnikrishnan
P. K. Abraham
Santha Devi
 William d'Cruz
 Mohanlal

Soundtrack 
The songs were composed by G. Devarajan and the lyrics were written by Mullanezhi.

References

https://m3db.com/film/vellam-malayalam-movie

External links
 
 Vellam on M3DB

1985 films
1980s Malayalam-language films
Films directed by Hariharan